Einar Werner Sahlstein (30 May 1887 – 6 March 1936) was a Finnish gymnast who won bronze in the 1908 Summer Olympics. He also won two Finnish national championships in track and field athletics.

Sport

Gymnastics 

He won the Finnish national championship in team gymnastics as a member of Ylioppilasvoimistelijat in 1909.

Track and field 

At the 1908 Finnish Athletics Championships, he won a gold in the two-handed javelin throw event, and another one in the combined jumps event.

Other 

He was a chairman of the club Warkauden Urheilijat.

He was a founding member of the club Ounasvaaran Hiihtoseura and a board member in 1927–1935.

Career 

He performed his matriculation exam in Kuopio Finnish Coeducational School in 1908 and a legal degree the University of Helsinki in 1912. He worked in banking since 1913.

He was in the staff of the Rovaniemi White Guard. He led a platoon in the Rovaniemi skirmish in the opening days of the Finnish Civil War. He received The medal of merit of the Civil Guards.

He sat in the municipal council of Rovaniemi kauppala.

Family 

His parents were provincial treasurer Verner Sahlstein and Hulda von Fieandt. He married Aino Castren in 1916. They had four children.

References 

1887 births
1936 deaths
Finnish male artistic gymnasts
Gymnasts at the 1908 Summer Olympics
Olympic gymnasts of Finland
Olympic bronze medalists for Finland
Olympic medalists in gymnastics
Medalists at the 1908 Summer Olympics
People from Kuopio Province (Grand Duchy of Finland)
20th-century Finnish people